Thunder in the Distance is the third album of the melodic hard rock project Place Vendome. The songwriting for this album was provided by Timo Tolkki (ex-Stratovarius), Magnus Karlsson (Primal Fear), Alessandro Del Vecchio (Hardline), Brett Jones, Tommy Denander (Radioactive), Sören Kronqvist (Sunstorm), Roberto Tiranti and Andrea Cantarelli (Labyrinth).

A music video was filmed for the song "".

It was released on 1 November 2013 with cover art credited to Stanis W. Decker.

Track listing

Credits

Band members
 Michael Kiske – vocals
 Uwe Reitenauer – guitars
 Dennis Ward – bass guitar, producer
 Dirk Bruinenberg – drums
 Gunther Werno – keyboards

References

External links
 Frontiers Records official website – P.V – Thunder In The Distance

2013 albums
Place Vendome (band) albums
Frontiers Records albums
Albums produced by Dennis Ward (musician)